Case Closed: The Bride of Halloween, known as  in Japan, is a 2022 Japanese animated mystery film directed by Susumu Mitsunaka. It is the twenty-fifth installment of the Case Closed film series based on the manga series of the same name by Gosho Aoyama, following the 2021 film Case Closed: The Scarlet Bullet. The film was released in Japan on April 15, 2022.

Plot 
Former MPD superintendent Tsutomu Muranaka, set to marry his fiancée Christine Richard, receives a death threat. With police protection ensured, the police attempt to practice fighting against any threats that would happen during the wedding. Meanwhile, while chasing a serial bomber that has escaped custody, Rei Furuya is knocked unconscious and a bomb is attached to his neck. The next day, while visiting the MPD headquarters, Kogoro, Ran, Conan, and the Detective Boys come across a man holding a tablet that explodes, with Kogoro being injured while trying to protect Haibara. Conan later meets with Rei, and learns that the explosion is possibly related to an attempted bombing incident that Rei and his teammates - Morofushi, Matsuda, and Date - had prevented years ago.

Afterwards, Ran, Conan, and the Detective Boys are invited to Shibuya for location scouting for the wedding, set to take place during the Halloween festival. Christine receives a message that tells her to retrieve something, but she and Muranaka are set to have a meeting soon, so she lets the Detective Boys take the gift for her. However, when they reach the area, they find the same bomb that Rei had defused 3 years earlier and narrowly escape just as it explodes. Meanwhile, Detective Chiba is kidnapped by an unknown perpetrator, who demands to meet Detective Matsuda, not knowing that Matsuda has died 3 years ago. Detective Takagi disguises himself as Matsuda and meets with the perpetrator, who reveals herself as Elenica Lavrentyeva, the leader of Nado Unichtozit, a civilian group focusing on capturing the bomber Plamya, responsible for the bomb on Rei's neck. Elenica reveals that the hostage found during the bombing incident years ago was her brother, who had escaped with the help of Matsuda and stole a tablet from Plamya, only to be killed in front of the MPD headquarters.

The police infiltrate the area and the Nado Unichtozit members escape. Later, Christine, who considers cancelling the wedding, receives a message that forces her to hold it instead. Christine and Muranaka have the ceremony in private. With Ran's help, Conan notices a pattern of the enclosed Shibuya roads for the festival that matches the paper Elenica's brother was holding during the time of his death, and thus deduces that Muranaka might be Plamya. Conan works with Nado Unichtozit to infiltrate the wedding, only for Christine to be revealed as Plamya instead - she had led the Detective Boys to the bomb-filled building, brought the Nado Unichtozit members to Japan, and rigged the entire Shibuya festival area with the two liquids used in the bombs which, upon interaction, would create a huge explosion. Christine attempts to escape on a helicopter, but Rei, who has managed to defuse the bomb on his neck, intercepts her and blows up the helicopter, fighting her as it crashes onto the ground below.

Muranaka knocks Christine unconscious, while Conan convinces Elenica to not murder Christine. Conan, the Detective Boys, and all the members of Nado Unichtozit work together to use a huge inflatable ball to block both liquids from interacting, thus preventing the explosion that would destroy Shibuya. Christine is arrested, the liquids are cleaned from the streets, and Muranaka promises Elenica that Christine will get the justice she deserves.

Cast

Box office 
Detective Conan: The Bride of Halloween debuted at no. 1 in its first weekend, with a sell of about 1,321,944 tickets in its first three days.

Here is a table which shows the box office of this movie of all the weekends in Japan:

Detective Conan: The Bride of Halloween on its eleventh weekend (25-26 June) still managed to remain in Top 10 at 10th Rank with total admissions reaches upto 6,478,540 with total gross of ¥9,029,251,300 ($66.79 million). On its 13th Weekend, Bride of Halloween dropped out of Top 10 but still managed to earn 34,587,050 yen (about US$252,000) with cumulative total of 9,164,972,550 yen ($66.82 Million).

Other territories 
In China, the film's Opening Takes China Box Office to ¥4 Billion ($11.7 millions) Annual Total. after that the movie fell to second place, adding ¥1.8 million for a three weekend total of $19.4 million.

Release 
Detective Conan: The Bride of Halloween was premiered on May 13–16 and was set to air officially on May 26 in Thailand, but later changed to May 25. It was released in Singapore and Malaysia on June 2, 2022, It was also released in Spain on July 8, 2022, South Korea on July 13, 2022, Indonesia on July 20, 2022, and Vietnam on July 22, 2022.

References

External links
  
 
 

2022 films
2022 anime films
Bride of Halloween, The
TMS Entertainment
Toho animated films
Japanese crime films
Japanese action films
Japanese mystery films
Anime action films
Anime mystery films
Animated films set in Tokyo
Films about weddings
Japanese films about Halloween